Leonora or Leonara may refer to:

People
Leonora (given name), a feminine given name
Leonora of Castile (disambiguation)
Leonora of England (1162–1216), Queen of Castile and Toledo as wife of Alfonso VIII of Castile
Leonora (singer) (born 1998), Danish singer representing her country at the Eurovision Song Contest 2019
John Leonora (1928–2006), research scientist, Loma Linda University

Places 
Leonora, Guyana
Leonora, Western Australia
Shire of Leonora, a local government area of Western Australia

Arts and entertainment
Leonora (opera), the original title of Ludwig van Beethoven's opera Fidelio, in which the heroine is named Leonora (or Leonore in German)
Leonora (opera) by William Henry Fry (the first known performance of an opera by an American composer on March 18, 1845)
Leonora (opera), the 1804 opera by Ferdinando Paer based on the same source as the work by Beethoven
Leonora, heroine of the opera Il trovatore, the 1853 opera by Giuseppe Verdi based on the 1836 drama El trovador by Antonio García Gutiérrez
Leonora, heroine of the opera La forza del destino, the 1862 opera by Giuseppe Verdi based on the 1835 drama Don Álvaro o la fuerza del sino by Ángel de Saavedra, 3rd Duke of Rivas
Leonora, another name for Lenore (ballad), by Gottfried August Bürger
Leonora (novel), by Maria Edgeworth
Leonora (film), a 1984 Australian film
Leonora, a novel by Hazel Holt
Leonora, a novel by Arnold Bennett
Leonora, the main character of a brief narrative pocket in Henry Fielding's Joseph Andrews

Other
696 Leonora, a minor planet

See also
 Lenora (disambiguation)
 Leonora (disambiguation)